Rusty Ross  is an actor currently residing in New York City. In 2006, he appeared in the original cast of Dr. Seuss' How the Grinch Stole Christmas! on Broadway, and reprised his role when the production returned in 2007. As the role of Professor, he recently completed the national tour of the Lincoln Center Theater production of South Pacific, which began performances in San Francisco in September 2009 and closed in Toronto in March 2011.

Interviews

References

External links
Official website at www.rustyross.com
Rusty Ross at the Internet Off-Broadway Database

Living people
Year of birth missing (living people)